This article serves as an index – as complete as possible – of all the honorific orders or similar decorations awarded by Terengganu, classified by Monarchies chapter and Republics chapter, and, under each chapter, recipients' countries and the detailed list of recipients.

Awards

MONARCHIES

Terengganu Royal Family 

They have been awarded:

 Sultan Mizan Zainal Abidin of Terengganu :
  Grand Master and recipient of the Supreme Royal Family Order of Terengganu (DKT, since 15 May 1998)
  Founding Grand Master and recipient of the Royal Family Order of Terengganu (DKR, 6 July 2000)
  First Class (DK I, 9 March 1981) and Grand Master (since 15 May 1998) of the Family Order of Terengganu 
 Order of Sultan Mizan Zainal Abidin of Terengganu : 
  Founding Grand Master and Knight Grand Companion (SSMZ, 6 July 2001) with title Dato’ Seri
  Funding Supreme class (SUMZ, 26.5.2005) 
  Member Grand Companion (SSMT, 12 Feb. 1989) and Grand Master (since 15 May 1998) of the Order of Sultan Mahmud I of Terengganu with title Dato’ Seri
  Knight Grand Commander (SPMT, 6 March 1982) and Grand Master (since 15 May 1998) of the Order of the Crown of Terengganu with title Dato’
Sultanah Nur Zahirah :
  First Class of the Family Order of Terengganu (DK I, 16.1.1999)
  Knight Grand Companion of the Order of Sultan Mizan Zainal Abidin of Terengganu (SSMZ, 6.7.2001) with title Dato’ Seri
  Member Grand Companion of the Order of Sultan Mahmud I of Terengganu (SSMT, 9.7.1998) with title Dato’ Seri
Tengku Muhammad Ismail, Heir Apparent :
  Member of the Royal Family Order of Terengganu (DKR, 14.12.2011) 
  First Class of the Family Order of Terengganu (DK I,12.12.2006)
  Knight Grand Companion of the Order of Sultan Mizan Zainal Abidin of Terengganu (SSMZ) with title Dato’ Seri
Y.T.M. Tengku Dato’ Mustafa Kamil, Tengku Sri Bendahara Raja (Sultan's 1st younger brother) :
  Second Class (DK II)
  Member Grand Companion of the Order of Sultan Mahmud I of Terengganu (SSMT, 29.4.1991) with title Dato’ Seri
Y.T.M. Tengku Dato’ Sri Badr ul-Zaman, Tengku Sri Panglima Raja (Sultan's 2nd younger brother) :
  Second Class (DK II)
  Member Grand Companion of the Order of Sultan Mahmud I of Terengganu (SSMT) with title Dato’ Seri
Y.A.M. Tengku Dato’ Badr ul-Hisham [Bahar ud-din], Tengku Sri Temenggong Raja (Sultan's 3rd younger brother) :
  Second Class (DK II)
  Member Grand Companion of the Order of Sultan Mahmud I of Terengganu (SSMT) with title Dato’ Seri
Y.A.M. Dato’ Hajjah Tengku Amira Zahara Farah Qurashiyah , Tengku Kamala Putri (Sultan's elder sister) :
  Second Class (DK II)
  Member Grand Companion of the Order of Sultan Mahmud I of Terengganu (SSMT) with title Dato’ Seri
Y.A.M. Tengku Nur Rohana Fathia Putri [Tengku Ana] (Sultan's 1st younger sister) :
  Second Class (DK II)
  Member Grand Companion of the Order of Sultan Mahmud I of Terengganu (SSMT) with title Dato’ Seri
Y.A.M. Tengku Dato’ Rahima Putri (Sultan's 2nd younger sister) :
  Second Class (DK II)
  Member Grand Companion of the Order of Sultan Mahmud I of Terengganu (SSMT) with title Dato’ Seri

 STATES of MALAYSIA

Johor Royal Family 
They have been awarded :

 Sultan Ibrahim Ismail of Johor :
  Member first class of the Family Order of Terengganu (DK I, 27/04/2013)

Kelantan Royal Family 
They have been awarded:

 Ismail Petra of Kelantan, Sultan Muhammad V of Kelantan's father and retired Sultan for illness :
  Member first class of the Family Order of Terengganu (DK I)

Negeri Sembilan Royal Family 
They have been awarded :

 Muhriz of Negeri Sembilan, Yang di-Pertuan Besar :
  Member first class of the Family Order of Terengganu (DK I)

Pahang Royal Family 
They have been awarded :

 Ahmad Shah of Pahang : 
  Member first class of the Family Order of Terengganu (DK I)
 Tengku Abdullah, Crown Prince of Pahang :
  Member first class of the Family Order of Terengganu (DK I)
 Tengku Ibrahim, Tengku Arif Bendahara, eldest younger brother of the sultan.
  Member Grand Companion of the Order of Sultan Mahmud I of Terengganu (SSMT) with title Dato’ Seri
 Tengku Abdullah, Tengku Arif Bendahara, second younger brother of the sultan.
  Member Grand Companion of the Order of Sultan Mahmud I of Terengganu (SSMT) with title Dato’ Seri
  Knight Grand Commander of Order of the Crown of Terengganu (SPMT) with title Dato’

Perlis Royal Family 
 Sultan Sirajuddin of Perlis:
 Family Order of Terengganu :  Member first class (DK I)  or  Member second class (DK II) 
  Member Grand Companion of the Order of Sultan Mahmud I of Terengganu (SSMT, 8.10.1998) with title Dato’ Seri

Selangor Royal Family 
They have been awarded :

 Sharafuddin of Selangor :
  Member first class of the Family Order of Terengganu (DK I)
 Tengku Ahmad Shah, third younger brother of Sultan Sharafuddin
  Member Knight Companion (DSMT), later Member Grand Companion (SSMT) of the Order of Sultan Mahmud I of Terengganu with title Dato’ Seri

Governors of Malacca 

 Mohd Khalil Yaakob ( 6th Yang di-Pertua Negeri of Malacca since 4 June 2004 ) : 
  Supreme class of the Order of Sultan Mizan Zainal Abidin of Terengganu (SUMZ) with title Dato’ Seri

To be completed  ...

 ASIAN MONARCHIES

Brunei Royal Family 
See also List of Malaysian Honours awarded to Heads of State and Royals

 Hassanal Bolkiah :
  Member first class of the Family Order of Terengganu (DK I, 4.10.1992)

Thai Royal Family 
 Queen Sirikit of Thailand : 
  Member of the Royal Family Order of Terengganu (DKR, 2009) 
 King Vajiralongkorn of Thailand : 
  Member second class of the Family Order of Terengganu (DK II)

to be completed

 EUROPEAN MONARCHIES

To be completed if any ...

REPUBLICS 

To be completed if any ...

See also 
 Mirror page : List of honours of the Terengganu Royal Family by country

References 

 
Terengganu